Ceratrichia clara, commonly known as the clear forest sylph, is a species of butterfly in the family Hesperiidae. It is found in Guinea, Ivory Coast, Ghana, Nigeria, Cameroon, Equatorial Guinea, Gabon, the Republic of the Congo, the Democratic Republic of the Congo, Uganda and Tanzania. The habitat consists of forests.

Subspecies
Ceratrichia clara clara (Guinea, Ivory Coast, Ghana, Nigeria, western Cameroon)
Ceratrichia clara medea Evans, 1937 (Cameroon: except west, Equatorial Guinea: Bioko, Gabon, Congo, Democratic Republic of the Congo, Uganda, north-western Tanzania)

References

Butterflies described in 1937
Hesperiinae